Maxwell is a village in Colfax County, New Mexico, United States. The population was 254 at the 2010 census, down from 274 in 2000. Maxwell was established in 1879 as a railroad town on the Atchison, Topeka and Santa Fe Railway. It was named in honor of Lucien Maxwell, who provided the land for the original townsite from his Maxwell Land Grant.

Geography
Maxwell is located near the center of Colfax County at  (36.539487, -104.542630), in the valley of the Canadian River. Interstate 25 passes through the east side of the village, with access from Exit 426. I-25 leads north  to Raton, the Colfax County seat, and southwest  to Las Vegas.

The refuge offers excellent birding opportunities during the spring and fall migrations. It consists of several lakes, fields and woodlots managed for birds and the areas other wildlife.

Demographics

As of the census of 2000, there were 274 people, 117 households, and 76 families residing in the village. The population density was 577.5 people per square mile (225.1/km2). There were 148 housing units at an average density of 311.9 per square mile (121.6/km2). The racial makeup of the village was 86.50% White, 4.01% Native American, 7.30% from other races, and 2.19% from two or more races. Hispanic or Latino of any race were 55.47% of the population.

There were 117 households, out of which 29.9% had children under the age of 18 living with them, 51.3% were married couples living together, 11.1% had a female householder with no husband present, and 34.2% were non-families. 29.9% of all households were made up of individuals, and 14.5% had someone living alone who was 65 years of age or older. The average household size was 2.34 and the average family size was 2.91.

In the village, the population was spread out, with 25.2% under the age of 18, 6.9% from 18 to 24, 24.5% from 25 to 44, 23.7% from 45 to 64, and 19.7% who were 65 years of age or older. The median age was 41 years. For every 100 females, there were 101.5 males. For every 100 females age 18 and over, there were 86.4 males.

The median income for a household in the village was $23,750, and the median income for a family was $28,750. Males had a median income of $22,083 versus $20,625 for females. The per capita income for the village was $11,231. About 22.0% of families and 21.9% of the population were below the poverty line, including 24.6% of those under the age of eighteen and 8.0% of those 65 or over.

1964 tornado
On May 29, 1964, an F3 tornado struck Maxwell and claimed one life, causing eight injuries. A total of 50 homes were destroyed. It was one of only four F3 tornadoes in New Mexico history.

References

Villages in Colfax County, New Mexico
Villages in New Mexico